9th Empyrean is the second studio album by Taiwanese black metal band Chthonic, released in 2000. The album was originally only available in Taiwan, until it was re-released by Nightfall Records in English format in 2002.  Both versions of the album are now out of print and is hard to find.

It is the only Chthonic album to feature two different (although similar) album covers upon its initial release.

Track listing

Chinese version

English version (2002)

Personnel
 Freddy Lim – lead vocals, erhu
 Jesse Liu – guitar, backing vocals
 Doris Yeh – bass, backing vocals
 Ambrosia – keyboards
 A-Jay – drums

References

2000 albums
Chthonic (band) albums